Brüggen Castle is a water castle in the southeastern part of the Lower Rhine municipality of Brüggen in North Rhine-Westphalia. It was the most important castle in the north of the Duchy of Jülich.

The castle was built by the Count of Kessel in the 13th century to guard a ford over the River Schwalm. In the early 14th century it went into the possession of the dukes of Jülich, who had the existing building replaced by a quadrangular castle made from brick. After the occupation of Brüggen in 1794 by Napoleonic troops it was confiscated and resold by the French government to a private individual at the beginning of the 19th century. Today part of the castle houses a hunting and natural history museum.

Literature 

 Paul Clemen (ed.): Die Kunstdenkmäler des Kreises Kempen. L. Schwann, Düsseldorf, 1891 (Die Kunstdenkmäler der Rheinprovinz. Vol.1, Part 1), pp. 23–27 (online)
 Bernhard Gondorf, Werner Otto: Burgen und Schlösser. Höhepunkte niederrheinischer Baukunst. Mercator, Duisburg, 1991, p. 53.
 Manfred A. Jülicher: Burg Brüggen im Wechsel der Geschichte. Eigenverlag, Niederkrüchten 1979.
 Gregor Spohr: Wie schön hier, zu verträumen. Schlösser am Niederrhein. Pomp, Bottrop/Essen, 2001, pp. 14–17.

External links 

 360° panorama of castle and mill (flash or Quicktime plugin needed)

Water castles in North Rhine-Westphalia
Museums in North Rhine-Westphalia
Rhineland
Buildings and structures in Viersen (district)
Hunting museums
Natural history museums in Germany
Brick Gothic
Gothic architecture in Germany